Leptodirini is a tribe of small carrion beetles in the family Leiodidae. There are more than 190 genera and 750 described species in Leptodirini.

See also
 List of Leptodirini genera

References

Further reading

External links

 

Leiodidae